Euphrasius of Lugo (681–688) was a medieval Galician clergyman.

References
 Consello da Cultura Galega (ed.), Documentos da Catedral de Lugo, (Santiago de Compostela, 1998)

7th-century Galician bishops
681 births
688 deaths